Lee Kwang-jun (born 6 January 1996) is a South Korean footballer currently playing as a centre-back for Pohang Steelers.

Career statistics

Club

Notes

References

1996 births
Living people
Dankook University alumni
South Korean footballers
Association football defenders
K League 1 players
K3 League players
Pohang Steelers players
Daejeon Hana Citizen FC players
Gimhae FC players